Moscow Defense Brief is an English-language defense magazine published by Centre for Analysis of Strategies and Technologies (CAST), an independent defense think-tank in Moscow, Russia.

Overview 
The purpose of Moscow Defense Brief is to provide analysis of developments and trends in Russia's defense policy and industry, tailored to the demands of defense and security professionals in the English-speaking world. The articles in Moscow Defense Brief are written by both full-time analysts at CAST and a number of independent experts.

The magazine was launched in 2004, and its reports have since been regularly cited by news sources such as The Moscow Times, The Wall Street Journal, Reuters, and the BBC News. The magazine's last regular issue was published in December 2018, since then MDB is published on ad-hoc basis.

The Editor-in-Chief of Moscow Defense Brief is Mikhail Barabanov and the project director is Andrey Frolov.

Subscribers receive not only a print edition of each new issue, but they are also given online access to every previously published Moscow Defense Brief through the Centre for Analysis of Strategies and Technologies website since 2004.

Format 

Moscow Defense Brief issues are typically separated into sections on international relations, Russian defense industry topics, the arms trade, the Russian Armed Forces, interviews with prominent defense industry or government officials, and quantitative data.  Moscow Defense Brief publishes the yearly figures for Russia's arms sales, which is the most comprehensive source of Russian foreign military-technical cooperation data.

See also 
Centre for Analysis of Strategies and Technologies

References

External links 
Moscow Defense Brief Homepage

2004 establishments in Russia
Bi-monthly magazines
Magazines established in 2004
Magazines published in Moscow
Military magazines
Magazines published in Russia
English-language magazines
Irregular journals